Ryan McMahen (born December 22, 1982) is an American soccer player who retired from professional soccer in January 2011.

Career

Collegiate and amateur

McMahen played college soccer at Michigan State University from 2001 to 2005. He finished his career with 26 goals and 28 assists, coming out of the midfield; the latter was good enough for second all-time in school history.  While at Michigan State, McMahen garnered many accolades including All Big Ten three times, and All America as a senior. During his college years he also played with the Michigan Bucks in the Premier Development League, where he was an All League Performer.

Professional
McMahen was drafted in the second round, 16th overall, by the Kansas City Wizards in 2006 MLS Supplemental Draft, but saw no playing time with the first team during the 2006 season.

He made his professional debut on July 12, 2006, in the Lamar Hunt U.S. Open Cup match against Des Moines Menace, playing the full game.  He also made an appearance on July 1, 2008, in the same competition, starting the match against the Carolina Railhawks.

McMahen was waived by the Wizards on September 5, 2008, never having registered a single minute in a Major League Soccer game.  He joined Austin Aztex of the USL First Division for the 2009 season, but was released by the Aztex at the end of the year.

References

External links
Austin Aztex bio – archived on April 18, 2009
MLS player profile

1982 births
Living people
American soccer players
Austin Aztex FC players
Sporting Kansas City players
Flint City Bucks players
Michigan State Spartans men's soccer players
USL League Two players
USL First Division players
Sporting Kansas City draft picks
People from Munster, Indiana
Soccer players from Indiana
Association football midfielders